Saif Al Hashan is a Kuwaiti professional footballer who for the Kuwait national football team.

After winning the AFC Cup 2014 with his team Qadsia , He won the most valuable player of the tournament.

In November 2014 he was nominated for best Asian player alongside Nassir Al-Shamrani and Ali Adnan.

Honors

Club

Al-Qadisa
 Kuwaiti Premier League (2): 2011–12, 2013–14
 Kuwait Emir Cup (3): 2011–12, 2012–13, 2014–15
 Kuwait Crown Prince Cup (3): 2012–13, 2013–14, 2017–18
 Kuwait Super Cup (4): 2013, 2014, 2018, 2019
 AFC Cup (1): 2014

External links
 
 

Living people
1990 births
Kuwaiti footballers
Kuwait international footballers
Association football forwards
Qadsia SC players
Al-Shabab FC (Riyadh) players
Kuwait Premier League players
Saudi Professional League players
Expatriate footballers in Saudi Arabia
Kuwaiti expatriate sportspeople in Saudi Arabia
AFC Cup winning players
Kuwaiti expatriate footballers
Al-Arabi SC (Kuwait) players